Redoutable was the lead ship of the  s of the French Navy launched in 1928 at Cherbourg, France. It participated in the Second World War, first on the side of the Allies from 1939 to 1940, then on the side of the Axis for the rest of the war. She was scuttled by the French on 27 November 1942 to prevent her capture by the Germans during their advance on Toulon, but was then refloated by the Italians in 1943. On 11 March 1944 she was sunk by bombs from Allied aircraft.

Development

Context
The Washington Naval Treaty of 1922 sought to prevent a future naval arms race by imposing limits on the number and size of certain types of warships that each great power could possess. France sought to expand its submarine forces – which were not limited by the treaty – as an essential tool to defend its coastline and empire. The 1100-ton Requin-class submarines, designed in 1922, was the initial attempt to meet these requirements; however, the speed of the submarines was notably insufficient and the design overall was considered inferior to the last German submarines launched in 1918.

The design for the Requin class's successor was commissioned from general engineer of maritime engineering Léon Roquebert. Roquebert was tasked with creating a "grand cruiser" type of submarine, with the role of carrying out surveillance of an adversary's bases, destroying their communications by attacking their ships, while protecting French colonies. They were operate with a surface squadron and provide clearance of enemy vessels for it.

The building programme was expanded the following year with the Type II submarines.

Characteristics
Propulsion while surfaced was provided by two  diesel motors built by the Swiss manufacturer Sulzer. The submarines' electrical propulsion allowed it to attain speeds of 
 while submerged. Radio communication was through wireless antenna.

Redoutable had significant firepower. She was equipped with eleven torpedo tubes: four  tubes in fixed positions in the bow, a orientable platform for three 550 mm tubes behind the conning tower, and another orientable platform on the stern composed of two 550 mm and two  tubes. The 550 mm torpedoes were intended for use against large ships, with the 400 mm torpedoes for smaller boats. Torpedoes left a trail on the surface, which allowed the target to see and avoid the torpedo, as well as trace the torpedo back to its origin. The submarines were also fitted with a  deck gun, mounted in front of the conning tower and from 1929, dual anti-aerial  machine guns.

[[File:Casabianca profile view.svg|upright=1.5|thumb|Another view of Redoutable'''s profile]]Redoutable had a quick diving speed, submerging in between 30 and 40 seconds. She had a reputation of handling well while at sea, both at the surface and while diving. Her motors were relatively noisy, as was auxiliary propulsion while submerged, and this constituted the principal criticism of that submarine, despite their reliability. Their speed and powerful armament was balanced against their ability to detect targets, which was essentially by visual sight. She was equipped with three periscopes – an attack periscope, a surveillance periscope, and an auxiliary periscope – and a hydrophone for passive sonar.

History
ConstructionRedoutable was the first of 31 Redoutable-class submarines, also designated as the 1500 ton boats because of their displacement. The class entered service between 1931 and 1939.

Ordered in 1924, Redoutable was laid down on 1 July 1925 at the Arsenal de Cherbourg. She was launched on 24 February 1928 and was commissioned 10 July 1931. In 1932, she encountered problems with her diving systems and returned to Cherbourg for repairs.

Second World War

At the start of World War II, she was assigned to the seventh submarine division, based at Cherbourg, along with Vengeur. From 12 October to 2 November 1939, Redoutable carried out a surveillance mission to the Azores, where a part of the German commercial fleet, suspected of supplying German U-boats in fuel, was located. On the night of November 1 she encountered a cargo ship that was sailing all lights off. As the cargo refused to stop in accordance with the submarine's summons, the submarine fired warning shots with its 100 mm cannon, to which the cargo responded by further firing at the submarine. At that moment, Redoutable captured a message from the British freighter Egba who reported being attacked by a U-boat; The French submarine, understanding that she was attacking an ally, ceased fire and withdrew. In December 1939, he was sent to search for the German supply ship Altmark (10 000 barrels) in the centre of the Atlantic with Fresnel, Heron and Héros.

In June 1940, she was patrolling along the Tunisian coast to prevent a possible Italian landing. She was located in Bizerte when the armistice was signed on 25 June and was placed on guard in Toulon.

On 9 November 1942, the day after the Allied landing in North Africa, Redoutable was allowed to rearm. It was not completed when the Germans entered Toulon on 27 November and the submarine scuttled with the French fleet. The ship was refloated on 16 May 1943 to be repaired by the Italians. It was finally sunk by a bombardment on 11 March 1944 with the Pascal and Fresnel''.

References

Citations

Sources 

 
 

Redoutable-class submarines (1928)
1928 ships
World War II submarines of France